Sharma Bandhu (Sharma Brothers) refers to four Indian classical vocalist brothers, who perform bhajan and Hindu devotional music. They were born in the music family of Pandit Jyoti Prasad and Pandit Munshi Ram to the student of Pandit V. D. Paluskar, founder of Gandharva Mahavidyalaya. Quartet consists of the Pandit Gopal Sharma, Pandit Shukdev Sharma, Pandit Kaushalendra Sharma and Pandit Raghavendra Sharma.

Sharma brothers have been most famous for singing "Suraj Ki Garmi Se Jalte Hue Tan Ko" for 1974 Best Feature Film on National Integration winning Hindi film Parinay (1974).

Background
The four brothers were born in Muzaffarnagar town in state of western Uttar Pradesh, India, to Pandit Ramanand, son of Pandit Munshiram, in the family of Hindi-Urdu poet and Sanskrit translator Pandit Jyoti Prasad. Pandit Ramanand was a student of Hindustani musician Pandit Vishnu Digambar Paluskar and a popular singer and exponent of Ramcharitmanas of his time. Pandit Ramanand along with his younger brother Pandit Shiv Kumar sang Tulsidas's Ramcharitmanas, Vinaya Patrika etc. and originated, and were also the exponents of their own style called Shri Ram Darbar Shaily (style) for 60 years.

Performing career
The four real brothers Pt. Gopal Sharma, Shukdev Sharma, Kaushlendra Sharma and Reghvendra Sharma owe their tremendous popularity to an integrated style of presentation based on a Fine Blend of Indian Classical and Modern Music. The best part of their Bhajan and Ram Katha singing is the interspersing of it with heart touching commentary. They bring with them the rich tradition of Ram Darbar Music inherited from their father Late Pt. Shri Ramanand Ji Sharma.

Sharma Bandhu have travelled Extensively in and outside India spreading the message of Universal Love through Singing The Works of Great Saint Poets Like Tulsi, Kabir, Soor, Meera and others. They have Performed in United Kingdom, United States of America, South Africa, Singapore, Thailand, Mauritius, Indonesia and Nepal etc. In Nepal they had been Guests of Nepal Royal Family on several occasions. His most trusted musician includes Mr Dhananjay Mohan and Late Balram Sharma.

Sharma Bandhu have been associated with India's Public broadcaster Doordarshan since 1975 and rank among the most popular artists on Doordarshan and telecast till date. Sharma Brothers are currently living in Ujjain.

Albums
 Taruvar Ki Chhaya
 Bhajan Chalte Rahe
 Shreeram Sharanam Mama
 Mahashivratri
 Jaidev - The Composer
 Bhajan Suman
 Santo Ke Anubhav
 Sitaram Bolo Hari Ka Naam
 Amrit Dhara Raam Naam Ki
 The Magic Of Bhajans
 Mere Bhagwan Shri Ramji

Awards
Sharma Bandhu were Awarded Sangeet Natak Akademi Award for the year 1989 by U. P. Government, in recognition of their services in the field of Religious Music.

Sharma Bandhu are most known for the Bhajan Jaise Suraj Ki Garmi Se, penned by Indeevar with music from Jaidev for 22nd National Film Award Winning Hindi motion picture Parinay (1974).

References

Indian musical groups
Bhajan singers
Vocal quartets
Family musical groups
People from Muzaffarnagar
Music of Uttar Pradesh
Recipients of the Sangeet Natak Akademi Award